Rolf  Hansen (born 17 April 1949) is a Norwegian diplomat.

He is a cand.philol. by education, and started working for the Norwegian Ministry of Foreign Affairs in 1975. From 1993 to 1994 he was a sub-director in the Ministry of Foreign Affairs, and then spent three years as an adviser. From 1997 to 2000 he served as consul-general in Hong Kong. After being head of department in the Ministry of Foreign Affairs from 2001 to 2005, he served as consul-general in Minneapolis from 2005 to 2008 and the Norwegian ambassador to Syria from 2008.

References

1949 births
Living people
Norwegian civil servants
Ambassadors of Norway to Syria
Norwegian expatriates in the United States
Recipients of the Order of the Cross of Terra Mariana, 3rd Class